Mustang is a city in the southeastern corner of Canadian County, Oklahoma, United States. It is part of the Oklahoma City metropolitan statistical area. Mustang's population was 19,879 at the 2020 census, a 14.3% increase from 17,398 in 2010. The city is now primarily known as a bedroom community for Oklahoma City.

History
The Mustang post office was established in 1895, but the town was not formally established until Charles G. Jones, former mayor of Oklahoma City, filed the plat in November, 1901. During that same year, the Oklahoma City and Western Railroad (acquired later by the St. Louis and San Francisco Railway (Frisco) built a line from Oklahoma City to Chickasha that passed through Mustang.

Geography
Mustang is located at  (35.392644, -97.722905).

Demographics

As of the census of 2000, 13,156 people, 4,721 households, and 3,800 families were residing in the city.  The population density was 1,095.9 people per  mi2 (422.9/km2).  The 4,930 housing units averaged 410.7 per square mile (158.5/km2).  The racial makeup of the city was 91.63% White, 0.59% African American, 3.33% Native American, 0.50% Asian, 0.09% Pacific Islander, 0.78% from other races, and 3.08% from two or more races.  About 3.01% of the population was Hispanic or Latino of any race.

Of the 4,721 households, 42.6% had children under the age of 18 living with them, 66.6% were married couples living together, 10.1% had a female householder with no husband present, and 19.5% were not families. About 16.3% of all households were made up of individuals, and 6.5% had someone living alone who was 65 years of age or older.  The average household size was 2.76, and the average family size was 3.09.

In the city, the age distribution was  29.6% under 18, 7.9% from 18 to 24, 31.5% from 25 to 44, 22.5% from 45 to 64, and 8.6% who were 65 or older.  The median age was 34 years. For every 100 females, there were 94.8 males.  For every 100 females age 18 and over, there were 90.6 males.

The median income for a household in the city was $50,284, and for a family was $53,018. Males had a median income of $36,406 versus $24,856 for females. The per capita income for the city was $20,860.  5.6% of the population and 4.0% of families were below the poverty line.   7.6% of those under the age of 18 and 8.7% of those 65 and older were living below the poverty line.

Economy
Mustang's economy was based on agriculture until the middle of the 20th century. Major crops included wheat, oats, corn, cotton, sweet potatoes, watermelons, and cantaloupes. Until the 1920s, peach and other fruit orchards were the primary crops for local farmers. Truck farming remained prevalent into the 1940s, when the dairy and beef industries gained supremacy. In the 1960s, the town began evolving into a bedroom community for Oklahoma City.

Education
Mustang Public Schools is the school district, covering the City of Mustang and the areas in Oklahoma City immediately surrounding the city. Mustang High School serves the community.

Government
Mustang has a council-manager form of government. The mayor is Brian Grider, elected May, 2021.

Sports
Mustang is the home base of the Canadian Valley Rangerettes Mounted Drill Team. The Rangerettes are the three-time United States Equestrian Drill Association National Open Drill Champions.  The team captured the sport's highest prize, the SportsQuest Cup, in 2008, 2009, and 2011. The team also won the Kessler prize in 2012.

Notable places 

Wild Horse Park is a park that contains the city hall, two playgrounds, a memorial for those who served in the U.S. armed forces, a baseball stadium, a pond, a water park, town center (which includes a library, a senior citizens center and more), a dog park, a soccer field and more. The park is often used for town events and is used to set off fireworks at every 4th of July.

Notable people

 Bartees Strange, musician  
 Dan Bailey, Minnesota Vikings kicker
 Dennis Byrd, New York Jets defensive lineman
 Josh Cooper, Cleveland Browns wide receiver
 Kendall Cross, Olympic gold medalist in freestyle wrestling
 Shane Hamman, Olympic powerlifter

References

External links
 Mustang Chamber of Commerce Website
 City of Mustang Website

Cities in Canadian County, Oklahoma
Cities in Oklahoma
Oklahoma City metropolitan area
Enclaves in the United States